Tannirbavi Tree Park is a park in Mangalore city in the state of Karnataka in India. It is spread over two parcels of land including nine acres of Gurupura riverfront and 22.5 acres on the beachfront. This park has a variety of species from Western Ghats and herbal plants. The park also has a children's area, a food court, a cultural area, beachfront amenities such as an information kiosk, beach volleyball court and a beachfront relaxation area with Pergolas.

References 

Parks in Mangalore
Tourist attractions in Mangalore
2016 establishments in Karnataka